Patrick Charles Eugene Boone (born June 1, 1934) is an American singer and actor. He was a successful pop singer in the United States during the 1950s and early 1960s. He sold more than 45 million records, had 38 Top 40 hits, and appeared in more than 12 Hollywood films.

According to Billboard, Boone was the second-biggest charting artist of the late 1950s, behind only Elvis Presley, and was ranked at No. 9 in its listing of the Top 100 Top 40 Artists 1955–1995. Until the 2010s, Boone held the Billboard record for spending 220 consecutive weeks on the charts with one or more songs each week.

At the age of 23, Boone began hosting a half-hour ABC variety television series, The Pat Boone Chevy Showroom, which aired for 115 episodes (1957–1960). Many musical performers, including Edie Adams, Andy Williams, Pearl Bailey, and Johnny Mathis, made appearances on the show. His cover versions of rhythm and blues hits had a noticeable effect on the development of the broad popularity of rock and roll. Elvis Presley was the opening act for a 1955 Pat Boone show in Brooklyn, Ohio.

As an author, Boone had a number-one bestseller in the 1950s ('Twixt Twelve and Twenty, Prentice-Hall). In the 1960s, he focused on gospel music and is a member of the Gospel Music Hall of Fame. He continues to perform and speak as a motivational speaker, a television personality, and a conservative political commentator.

Early life 
Boone was born on June 1, 1934, in Jacksonville, Florida, the son of Margaret Virginia (née Pritchard) and Archie Altman Boone. He was raised in Nashville, Tennessee, where his family moved when he was two years old. Boone graduated in 1952 from David Lipscomb High School in Nashville. His younger brother, whose professional name was Nick Todd, was also a pop singer in the 1950s and later a church music leader.

In a 2007 interview on The 700 Club, Boone claimed to be the great-great-great-great-grandson of the American pioneer Daniel Boone.

In November 1953, when he was 19 years old, Boone married Chicago-born Tennesseean Shirley Lee Foley (April 24, 1934 – January 11, 2019), also 19 years old, daughter of country music great Red Foley and his wife, singer Judy Martin. They had four daughters: Cheryl "Cherry" Lynn, Linda "Lindy" Lee, Deborah "Debby" Ann, and Laura "Laury" Gene. Starting in the late 1950s, Boone and his family were residents of Teaneck, New Jersey. Shirley Boone was a lesser known recording artist and television personality than her husband. She also founded a hunger-relief Christian ministry, Mercy Corps. She died in 2019, aged 84, at the couple's Beverly Hills home from complications from vasculitis, which she had contracted less than a year earlier.

Pat primarily attended David Lipscomb College, and later Lipscomb University in Nashville. He graduated in 1958 from Columbia University School of General Studies magna cum laude having previously attended North Texas State University, now known as the University of North Texas, in Denton, Texas.

Career

Music 
Boone began his career by performing in Nashville's Centennial Park. He began recording in April 1953 for Republic Records (not to be confused with the current label with that name), and by 1955, for Dot Records. His 1955 version of Fats Domino's "Ain't That a Shame" was a hit. This set the stage for the early part of Boone's career, which focused on covering R&B songs by Black artists for a white American market. Randy Wood, the owner of Dot, had issued an R&B single by the Griffin Brothers in 1951 called "Tra La La-a"—a different song from the later LaVern Baker one—and he was keen to put out another version after the original had failed. This became the B-side of the first Boone single "Two Hearts Two Kisses", originally by the Charms – whose "Hearts Of Stone" had been covered by the label's Fontane Sisters.

A number-one single in 1956 by Boone was a second cover and a revival of a then seven-year-old song "I Almost Lost My Mind", by Ivory Joe Hunter, which was originally covered by another Black star, Nat King Cole. According to an opinion poll of high-school students in 1957, the singer was nearly the "two-to-one favorite over Elvis Presley among boys and preferred almost three-to-one by girls ..." During the late 1950s, he made regular appearances on ABC-TV's Ozark Jubilee, hosted by his father-in-law.
He cultivated a safe, wholesome, advertiser-friendly image that won him a long-term product endorsement contract from General Motors during the late 1950s, lasting through the 1960s. He succeeded Dinah Shore singing the praises of the GM product: "See the USA in your Chevrolet ... drive your Chevrolet through the USA, America's the greatest land of all!" GM had also sponsored The Pat Boone Chevy Showroom.

Many of Boone's hit singles were covers of hits from Black Rock and Roll artists. These included: "Ain't That a Shame" by Fats Domino; "Tutti Frutti" and "Long Tall Sally" by Little Richard; "At My Front Door (Crazy Little Mama)" by The El Dorados; and the blues ballads "I Almost Lost My Mind" by Ivory Joe Hunter, "I'll be Home" by the Flamingos and "Don't Forbid Me" by Charles Singleton. Boone has been highlighted as an example of whitewashing by taking songs by black artists and sanitising them to make them more palatable for a white audience, denying exposure to these black artists.  

Boone also wrote the lyrics for the instrumental theme song for the movie Exodus, which he titled "This Land Is Mine". (Ernest Gold had composed the music.)

As a conservative Christian, Boone declined certain songs and movie roles that he felt might compromise his beliefs—including a role with sex symbol Marilyn Monroe. In one of his first films, April Love, the director, Henry Levin, wanted him to give co-star Shirley Jones a kiss (which was not in the script). Since this would be his first onscreen kiss, Boone said that he wanted to talk to his wife first, to make sure it was all right with her. He had his own film production company, Cooga Mooga Productions.

He appeared as a regular performer on Arthur Godfrey and His Friends from 1955 through 1957, and later hosted his own The Pat Boone Chevy Showroom, on Thursday evenings. In 1959, Boone's likeness was licensed to DC Comics, first appearing in Superman's Girl Friend, Lois Lane No. 9 (May 1959) before starring in his own series from the publisher which lasted for five issues from September 1959 to May 1960.  In the early 1960s, he began writing a series of self-help books for adolescents, including 'Twixt Twelve and Twenty. The British Invasion ended Boone's career as a hitmaker, though he continued recording throughout the 1960s. In 1966, he participated in the Sanremo Music Festival in Italy, performing the songs Mai mai mai Valentina alongside Giorgio Gaber and Se tu non fossi qui with Peppino Gagliardi. During his trip to Italy, he visited the headquarter of Ferrari in Maranello, near Modena, with the intention of buying a Superamerica Sports Car, but Enzo Ferrari dissuaded him from purchasing that model by saying that there wouldn't have been enough room for Boone's four daughters, and sold him a four-door Ferrari 2+2 instead. In a 2021 interview, Boone admitted having later sold the "Ferrari he didn't like" to Tom Smothers of the comedic duo Smothers Brothers.

In the 1970s, he switched to gospel and country, and he continued performing in other media, as well. In the 1960s and 1970s. the Boone family toured as gospel singers and made gospel albums, such as The Pat Boone Family and The Family Who Prays.

In the early 1970s, Boone founded the record label Lamb & Lion Records. It featured artists such as Pat, the Pat Boone Family, Debby Boone, Dan Peek, DeGarmo and Key, and Dogwood. In 1974, Boone was signed to the Motown country subsidiary Melodyland.

In 1978, Boone became the first target in the Federal Trade Commission's crackdown on false-claim product endorsements by celebrities. He had appeared with his daughter Debby in a commercial to claim that all four of his daughters had found a preparation named Acne-Statin a "real help" in keeping their skin clear. The FTC filed a complaint against the manufacturer, contending that the product did not really keep skin free of blemishes. Boone eventually signed a consent order in which he promised not only to stop appearing in the ads, but also to pay about 2.5% of any money that the FTC or the courts might eventually order the manufacturer to refund to consumers. Boone said, through a lawyer, that his daughters actually did use Acne-Statin, and that he was "dismayed to learn that the product's efficacy had not been scientifically established as he believed."

Film 
In 1956, Boone was one of the biggest recording stars in the US. Several film studios pursued him for movies; he decided to go with 20th Century Fox, which had made Elvis Presley's first movie. Fox reworked a play he had bought, Bernardine, into a vehicle for Boone. The resulting film was a solid hit, earning $3.75 million in the US.
 
Even more popular was April Love (1957), a remake of Home in Indiana. Boone regards it as one of his favourites, "the kind of movie I wish I could have made 20 more of: a musical, appealing characters, some drama, a good storyline, a happy ending, it's the kind of film which makes you feel good. I never wanted to make a depressing or immoral film."

Less popular was a musical comedy Mardi Gras (1958), which was the last movie of Edmund Goulding. However, Journey to the Center of the Earth (1959), a science fiction adventure tale, was a huge hit. Boone had been reluctant to do it, and needed to be persuaded by being offered the chance to sing several songs and given a percentage of the profits, but was glad he did.

He produced and starred in a documentary, Salute to the Teenagers (1960), but did not make a film for a while, studying acting with Sanford Meisner. He returned with a military comedy, All Hands on Deck (1961), a mild hit.

He was one of several names in another remake, State Fair (1962), a box office disappointment. Musicals were becoming less fashionable in Hollywood, so Boone decided to take on a dramatic role in the Metro-Goldwyn-Mayer-distributed movie The Main Attraction (1962) for Seven Arts Productions, his first movie outside Fox. It was an unhappy experience for Boone as he disliked the implication his character had sex with Nancy Kwan's and he got into several public fights with the producers. He had a deal with Fox to make three films at $200,000 a film with his production company. This was meant to start with a thriller, The Yellow Canary (1963), in which Boone would play an unsympathetic character. New management came in at the studio which was unenthusiastic about the picture but because Boone had a pay or play deal, they decided to make it anyway, only with a much shorter budget. Boone even paid some money out of his own pocket to help complete it.

Boone's next movie for Fox was another low-budget effort, The Horror of It All (1963), shot in England. He made a comedy in Ireland, Never Put It in Writing (1964), for Allied Artists. Boone's third film for Fox was an "A" production, Goodbye Charlie (1964), but Boone was in support of Debbie Reynolds and Tony Curtis. He was one of the many names in The Greatest Story Ever Told (1965). He appeared in The Perils of Pauline (1967), a pilot for a TV series that did not eventuate, which was screened in some theatres. Boone's last film of note was The Cross and the Switchblade (1970).

Later work 
In 1994, Pat Boone played the title role in The Will Rogers Follies in Branson, Missouri.

In 1997, Boone released In a Metal Mood: No More Mr. Nice Guy, a collection of heavy metal covers. To promote the album, he appeared at the American Music Awards in black leather. He was then dismissed from Gospel America, a TV show on the Trinity Broadcasting Network. After making a special appearance on TBN with the president of the network, Paul Crouch, and his pastor, Jack Hayford, many fans accepted his explanation of the leather outfit being a "parody of himself". Trinity Broadcasting then reinstated him, and Gospel America was brought back.

In 2003, the Nashville Gospel Music Association recognized his gospel recording work by inducting him into its Gospel Music Hall of Fame. In September 2006, Boone released We Are Family: R&B Classics, featuring cover versions of 11 R&B hits, including the title track, plus "Papa's Got A Brand New Bag", "Soul Man", "Get Down Tonight", "A Woman Needs Love", and six other classics.

In 2010, plans were announced for the Pat Boone Family Theater at Broadway at the Beach in Myrtle Beach, South Carolina. The attraction was never built.

In 2011, Boone acted as a spokesperson for Security One Lending, a reverse mortgage company. Since at least 2007 Boone has acted as a spokesperson for Swiss America Trading Corporation, a broker of gold and silver coins that warns of "America's Economic Collapse".

Personal life

Religion 
Boone grew up in the Church of Christ. In the 1960s, Boone's marriage to Shirley Foley nearly came to an end because of his use of alcohol and his preference for attending parties. However, after coming into contact with the Charismatic Movement, Shirley began to focus more on her religion and eventually influenced Pat and their daughters toward a similar religious focus.  At this time, they attended the Inglewood Church of Christ.

In the spring of 1964, Boone spoke at a "Project Prayer" rally attended by 2,500 at the Shrine Auditorium in Los Angeles. The gathering, which was hosted by Anthony Eisley, a star of ABC's Hawaiian Eye series, sought to flood the United States Congress with letters in support of mandatory school prayer, following two decisions in 1962 and 1963 of the United States Supreme Court which struck down mandatory prayer as conflicting with the Establishment Clause of the First Amendment to the United States Constitution. Joining Boone and Eisley at the Project Prayer rally were Walter Brennan, Lloyd Nolan, Rhonda Fleming, Gloria Swanson, and Dale Evans. Boone declared, "what the communists want is to subvert and undermine our young people. ... I believe in the power of aroused Americans, I believe in the wisdom of our Constitution. ... the power of God." It was noted that Roy Rogers, John Wayne, Ronald Reagan, Mary Pickford, Jane Russell, Ginger Rogers, and Pat Buttram had endorsed the goals of the rally and would also have attended had their schedules not been in conflict.

In the early 1970s, the Boones hosted Bible studies for celebrities such as Doris Day, Glenn Ford, Zsa Zsa Gabor, and Priscilla Presley at their Beverly Hills home. The family then began attending The Church On The Way in Van Nuys, a Foursquare Gospel megachurch pastored by Jack Hayford.

On an April 22, 2016, broadcast of Fox News Radio's The Alan Colmes Show, Boone discussed an episode of Saturday Night Live which included a sketch entitled God Is a Boob Man; the sketch parodied the film God's Not Dead 2, in which Boone had a role. He described the sketch as "blasphemy", stating that the Federal Communications Commission should forbid any such content, and that it should revoke the broadcast licenses of any "network, or whoever is responsible for the shows".

Politics 
Boone supported Barry Goldwater in the 1964 United States presidential election.

In the 2007 Kentucky gubernatorial election, Boone campaigned unsuccessfully for incumbent Republican Ernie Fletcher with a recorded automated telephone message stating that the Democratic Party candidate Steve Beshear would support "every homosexual cause." As part of the campaign, Boone asked, "Now do you want a governor who'd like Kentucky to be another San Francisco?"

On August 29, 2009, Boone wrote an article comparing American political liberalism to cancer, likening it to "black filthy cells".

In December 2009, Boone endorsed conservative Republican John Wayne Tucker's campaign in Missouri's 3rd congressional district against incumbent Russ Carnahan (D) in the 2010 midterm elections. In 2010, Boone endorsed Republican Clayton Trotter in the race for Texas's 20th congressional district with an ad campaign referencing his song "Speedy Gonzales", about the Looney Tunes character, which critics have characterized as offensive stereotypes.

Boone received a lifetime achievement award at the 38th annual Conservative Political Action Conference held in February 2011.

In June 2016, Boone, along with Mike Huckabee and executive producer Troy Duhon, all of whom were involved in the film God's Not Dead 2, sent a letter to California Governor Jerry Brown in opposition to Senate Bill 1146 which "prohibits a person from being subjected to discrimination" at California colleges. Other than schools that train pastors and theology teachers, schools "might no longer be allowed to hire Christian-only staff, teach religious ideas in regular classes, require attendance at chapel services, or keep bathrooms and dormitories restricted to either males or females."

Basketball 
Boone is a basketball fan and had ownership interests in two teams. He owned a team in the Hollywood Studio League called the Cooga Moogas. The Cooga Moogas included Bill Cosby, Rafer Johnson, Gardner McKay, Don Murray, and Denny "Tarzan" Miller.

With the founding of the American Basketball Association, Boone became the majority owner of the league's team in Oakland, California, on February 2, 1967. The team was first named the Oakland Americans, but was later renamed as the Oakland Oaks, the name under which it played from 1967 to 1969. The Oaks won the 1969 ABA championship.

Despite the Oaks' success on the court, the team had severe financial problems. By August 1969, the Bank of America was threatening to foreclose on a $1.2 million loan to the Oaks, and the team was sold to a group of businessmen in Washington, D.C., and became the Washington Caps.

Boone later played for the Virginia Creepers, an 80–84 age group Senior Olympics team that narrowly lost to the gold medal-winning team; Boone aged out (by turning 85) on June 1, 2019.

Discography

Studio albums

 Pat Boone
 Howdy!
 "Pat"
 Hymns We Love
 Pat's Great Hits
 Pat Boone Sings Irving Berlin
 Star Dust
 Yes Indeed!
 Tenderly
 Pat Boone Sings
 Side by Side 
 He Leadeth Me
 White Christmas
 Moonglow
 This and That
 Great! Great! Great!
 Moody River
 My God and I
 I'll See You in My Dreams
 Pat Boone Reads from the Holy Bible
 Pat Boone's Golden Hits Featuring Speedy Gonzales
  Love You Truly 
 Pat Boone Sings Guess Who? Pat Boone Sings Days of Wine and Roses The Star Spangled Banner Tie Me Kangaroo Down Sport Sing Along Without Pat Boone! The Touch of Your Lips Ain't That a Shame The Lord's Prayer and Other Great Hymns Boss Beat! Near You Blest Be Thy Name The Golden Era of Country Hits My 10th Anniversary with Dot Records Pat Boone Sings Winners of the Reader's Digest Poll Great Hits of 1965 Memories Wish You Were Here, Buddy Christmas Is A Comin' How Great Thou Art I Was Kaiser Bill's Batman Look Ahead Departure Songs for Jesus Folk In the Holy Land The New Songs of the Jesus People All in the Boone Family Born Again Family Who Prays Pat Boone S-A-V-E-D I Love You More and More Each Day The Pat Boone Family Songs from the Inner Court Something Supernatural Texas Woman The Country Side of Pat Boone Miracle Merry-Go-Round Just The Way I Am Songmaker Pat Boone Sings Golden Hymns Pat Boone with the First Nashville Jesus Band I Remember Red: A Tribute to Red Foley The Pat Boone Family Christmas Nearer My God to Thee In a Metal Mood: No More Mr. Nice Guy Echoes of Mercy The Miracle of Christmas American Glory Hopeless Romantic We Are Family: R&B ClassicsFilmography

1955: The Pied Piper of Cleveland (documentary)
1957: Bernardine1957: April Love1958: Mardi Gras1959: Journey to the Center of the Earth1960: Salute to the Teenagers (TV documentary) (producer and host)
1961: All Hands on Deck1962: State Fair1962: The Main Attraction1963: The Horror of It All1963: The Yellow Canary1964: Never Put It in Writing1964: Goodbye Charlie1965: The Greatest Story Ever Told1967: The Perils of Pauline1969: The Pigeon1970: The Cross and the Switchblade1989: Roger & Me (documentary)
1990: Music Machine (voice of Mr. Conductor)
1991: Benny's Biggest Battle (voice of Mr. Conductor)
1994: Precious Moments: Simon the Lamb (voice of The Shepherd)
1997: Space Ghost Coast to Coast (TV series)
2000: The Eyes of Tammy Faye (documentary)
2008: Hollywood on Fire (documentary)
2016: Boonville Redemption2016: God's Not Dead 22017: A Cowgirl's Story2022: The MulliganBox-office ranking
Boone was considered one of the most popular box-office stars in the U.S. as judged by the Quigley Poll of Movie Exhibitors in its Annual "Top Ten MoneyMakers Poll":
1957: 3rd most popular star
1958: 11th most popular
1959: 22nd most popular
1960: 22nd most popular

Bibliography (works published by Boone)'Twixt Twelve and Twenty: Pat talks to Teenagers (1958) Prentice Hall
"Between You, Me and the Gatepost" (1960) Prentice HallThe Solution to Crisis-America (1970) F. H. Revell Co, A Miracle Saved My Family (1971) Oliphants, The Real Christmas (1972) F. H. Revell Co, Joy! (1973) Creation House, My Brother's Keeper? (1975) Victory Press, My Faith (1976) C. R. Gibson Co, To Be or Not to Be an SOB: A Reaffirmation of Business Ethics (1979) Wordware Publishing, Incorporated, The Honeymoon Is Over (1980) Creation House, Marrying for Life: A Handbook of Marriage Skills (1982) HarperCollins Publishers, Pray to Win (1982) Putnam Pub Group, Pat Boone's Favorite Bible Stories (1984) Creation House, Pat Boone's Favorite Bible Stories for the Very Young (1984) Random House of Canada, Limited, A Miracle a Day Keeps the Devil Away (1986) Revell, New Song (1988) Impact Books, Miracle of Prayer (1989) Zondervan, The Human Touch: The Story of the National Easter Seal (1990)        Certification Review, Jesus Is Alive (1990) Thomas Nelson Inc, Double Agent (2002) Publish America, Incorporated, Goodnight, Whatever You Are!: My Journey with Zacherley, the Cool Ghoul (2006) Tradeselect Limited, Pat Boone's America: A Pop Culture Treasury of the Past Fifty Years (2006) B&H Publishing Group, Culture-Wise Family: Upholding Christian Values in A Mass-Media World (2007)        Gospel Light Publications, The Marriage Game (2007) New Leaf Press, Inc., Questions About God: And the Answers That Could Change Your Life (2008) Lighthouse Publishing, Pat Boone Devotional Book (2009) G. K. Hall, 

 Bibliography 
 University of North Texas Alumni Directory, Pat (Charles E.) Boone, (1994) 
 ASCAP Biographical Dictionary, fourth edition, compiled for the American Society of Composers, Authors and Publishers, by Jaques Cattell Press, R. R. Bowker (1980)   
 Biographical Dictionary of American Music, edited by Charles Eugene Claghorn (1911–2005), Parker Publishing Co., West Nyack, New York (1973)   
 Encyclopedia of Evangelicalism, by Randall Herbert Balmer, Baylor University Press (2004)   
 The Encyclopedia of Folk, Country & Western Music, second edition, by Irwin Stambler (born 1924) and Grelun S. Landon (1923–2004), St. Martin's Press (1983)   
 Baker's Biographical Dictionary of Musicians, eighth edition, revised by Nicolas Slonimsky, Macmillan Publishing Co. (1992)   
 Baker's Biographical Dictionary of Musicians, '' ninth edition, edited by Laura Kuhn, Schirmer Books (2001)

References

External links

Brief biography, by Tom Simon, December 25, 2002
Image of Pat Boone with his wife Shirley and their four children after disembarking a plane in Los Angeles, California, 1959. Los Angeles Times Photographic Archive (Collection 1429). UCLA Library Special Collections, Charles E. Young Research Library, University of California, Los Angeles.

 
1934 births
Living people
20th-century American male actors
20th-century American singers
20th-century American writers
20th Century Studios contract players
20th-century Protestants
21st-century American male actors
21st-century American writers
21st-century Protestants
American baritones
American Basketball Association executives
American Christian Zionists
American country singer-songwriters
American gospel singers
American crooners
American male film actors
American male voice actors
American male writers
American members of the Churches of Christ
Boone family (show business)
California Republicans
Columbia University School of General Studies alumni
Dot Records artists
Lamb & Lion Records artists
Lipscomb University alumni
Male actors from Jacksonville, Florida
Male actors from Los Angeles
Male actors from New Jersey
Members of the Foursquare Church
Motown artists
Music of Denton, Texas
Musicians from Jacksonville, Florida
Musicians from Nashville, Tennessee
People from Leonia, New Jersey
People from Teaneck, New Jersey
Traditional pop music singers
University of North Texas alumni
Writers from Los Angeles
Writers from New Jersey
New Right (United States)
20th-century American male singers
21st-century American male singers
21st-century American singers
Singer-songwriters from Tennessee
Singer-songwriters from Florida